Solapur Super Thermal Power Station is under construction located at Fatatewadi and Aherwadi village in Solapur district in Indian state of Maharashtra. The power plant is one of the coal based power plants of National Thermal Power Corporation Limited (NTPCL).

The water for the power project will be sourced from reservoir of Ujjani Dam on Bhima River.

Capacity
The power station has a planned capacity of 1320 MW (2x660 MW). The first unit of Solapur Super Thermal power station was commissioned and declared commercial on 25 September 2017.

References

6. Press Release (2012-06-02). Solapur Destined to become Power Hubs with arrival of NTPC Project

http://www.ntpc.co.in/en/media/press-releases/details/kudgi-and-solapur-destined-become-power-hubs-arrival-ntpc-projects

Coal-fired power stations in Maharashtra
Solapur district
Energy infrastructure completed in 2017
2017 establishments in Maharashtra